Hungarian Sign Language is the sign language of Deaf people in Hungary. There is historical evidence that Hungarian and Austrian Sign Language are related, but Bickford (2005) found that Hungarian, Slovak, and Czech Sign formed a cluster with Romanian, Bulgarian, and Polish Sign rather than with Austrian. Bickford also noted that there are about seven dialects of Hungarian Sign Language, with the variation connected to the residential Deaf school where it is taught.

In November 2009, the Hungarian Parliament unanimously passed Act CXXV of 2009 on Hungarian Sign Language and the use of Hungarian Sign Language. In 2020, the act was amended to place HSL on equal footing with spoken Hungarian when it comes to state-recognized exams, recognized the right to emphasize the use of HSL instead of mainstreaming Deaf children, and advancing the use of accessibility technologies.

The National Association of the Hungarian Deaf is called  (SINOSZ).

References

External links
 Dictionary of Hungarian Sign Language (with English Translation)
 SINOSZ

Languages of Hungary
French Sign Language family